Jean-Jacques Naudet (born in Paris in 1945) is a French journalist and iconographer, publication director of L'Œil de la photographie ("The Eye of Photography"), an online journal dedicated to photography.

Biography 
Naudet commenced his journalism career at Vogue writing movie reviews.

Encouraged by the mentorship of Roger Thérond, Director of the Hachette Filipacchi Publishing Company, in 1971 he joined a journal it published, the French magazine Photo and became editor-in-chief, occupying the position for eighteen years (1976 to 1988), was photographic correspondent for Paris Match, Elle, Premiere in New York, and contributed frequently on photography to Le Monde, and was then editor-at-large of American Photo for another 18 years, in which editor David Schonauer remarked on Naudet's career and contributions to the field;

"Jean-Jacques remains a familiar and influential figure in photography, attending festivals in Madrid, Arles, and Perpignan, snooping through galleries in Manhattan, and having lunch with an array of photographers, curators, and editors in search of good food and better gossip. He's been doing that for some 30 years, which gives him the knowledge and perspective needed to bring off a difficult feat like listing underrated photographers: He has seen major talents come, and he's seen them go. He knows how careers are launched and nurtured, and he knows how they can be undermined."

He was a correspondent for the Hachette-Filipacchi group in the United States, and member the jury of the Planches Contact festival from its creation in 2010.

Co-founder of Le Journal de la Photographie in 2010, he replaced it with L'Œil de la Photographie in October 2013, and it continues as an online publication.

Personal life 
Naudet has two sons, Jules Naudet and Gédéon Naudet, with whom he and his wife Shiva moved to New York in the late 1980s, he having made his first trip there in 1975. Son Jules made the only recording of the first airliner striking the World Trade Center on the morning of the attacks of September 11, 2001, later using the footage in the documentary that the pair directed; New York: September 11, which garnered two Emmy Awards in 2002.

Publications 
 
 
Marlène Dietrich, Thames & Hudson editions, 2001, 320 pages

Awards 

 2014:  Royal Photographic Society Hood Medal for his public service in photography.

References 

French journalists
1945 births
French editors
Historians of photography
Living people